Cameron James Yates (born 14 February 1999) is a Scottish footballer who plays as a goalkeeper for League of Ireland Premier Division club Dundalk.

Career

Leicester City 
Yates signed for the academy of Leicester City aged 9 years old (2008-2018) playing alongside the likes of Ben Chilwell, Harvey Barnes, Hamza Choudhury Kiernan Dewsbury-Hall and Luke Thomas but was unable to follow them into the first team squad. As a scholar, he captained the U18s team to the QF of the FA Yth cup losing narrowly to eventual winners Chelsea. He won the 2017 PL Save of the season for his spectacular stop against Middlesbrough in the FA Yth Cup.

He represented Scotland at U15/16 level winning caps against Ireland, Poland and Holland and featured in the 2015 Victory shield squad.

Wycombe Wanderers
On 3 September 2018, Yates joined Wycombe Wanderers. Despite not playing a professional game for Wycombe, on 27 September 2019, his contract was extended until June 2021.

Aylesbury United (loan)
On 16 October 2018, Yates moved on loan to Aylesbury United. He made his Aylesbury United debut on the same day against Bedford Town. His final match for Aylesbury United came against Sutton Coldfield Town on 3 November 2018, in which he was replaced at half-time due to an injury. He made three league appearances for the club.

Return to Wycombe
He made his professional debut in Wycombe's EFL Trophy game against Stevenage on 8 October 2019.

On 12 May 2021 it was announced that he would leave Wycombe at the end of the season.

Dundalk
Having been released by Wycombe Wanderers in June 2021, Yates signed for League of Ireland Premier Division club Dundalk on 17 August 2021.

Career statistics

References

External links

1999 births
Living people
Scottish footballers
Association football goalkeepers
Wycombe Wanderers F.C. players
Aylesbury United F.C. players
English Football League players
Southern Football League players
Footballers from Edinburgh
Dundalk F.C. players
League of Ireland players
Expatriate association footballers in the Republic of Ireland